American Flyers Airline Corporation (AFA) was a United States "supplemental" charter airline that operated from 1949 to 1971.

History 

The airline initially commenced operations in Fort Worth with Douglas DC-3 aircraft.  From 1960 to 1967 it took delivery of fifteen Lockheed Constellation and Lockheed L-188 Electra propeller aircraft. Following the owner's death in the late 1960s AFA was acquired by an affiliate of the Hillman Co. of Pittsburgh. It then began equipping itself with jet aircraft, starting with two Boeing 727 aircraft.

The American Flyers 727s made history by being the first airframes of the 727 type to operate transatlantic flights, from the mainland US to London Gatwick and Manchester in the United Kingdom, and to Frankfurt, Germany. Around this time the airline moved its operations to Middletown, Pennsylvania. 

By 1970, American Flyers was operating just two leased Douglas DC-8 Series 63CF having sold the Electras and later the Boeing 727s.

AFA was taken over by Universal Airlines on May 25, 1971, which in turn was absorbed by Saturn Airways the next year.  Its DC-8s went to Flying Tiger Line.

AFA was founded by Reed Pigman who was an early aviation pioneer who was instrumental in developing the VOR navigation system that is currently used worldwide today. Many of the employees of both the airline and its related Aviation School had a very affectionate relationship with Pigman, who frequently piloted AFA's Lockheed Electras on military charter flights nationwide.

Accidents 
On September 20, 1965, a Lockheed Constellation L-1049 Super Connie (N9719C) landing on Ardmore Municipal Airport overshot the wet runway into ditches. The aircraft sustained serious damage, no injuries or fatalities were reported. The aircraft was on a ferry flight.

American Flyers Airline Flight 280/D

Reed Pigman died on April 22, 1966, of a heart attack at the controls of a Lockheed Electra (N183H) and the resulting crash killed more than 80 military transients that were being flown under a Department of Defense contract charter from Monterey Regional Airport in California to Columbus Airport in Georgia, with a service stop and crew change in Ardmore, Oklahoma. The Electra had been used by The Beatles in their 1965 tour of the United States.

Existing weather at Ardmore that evening was scattered thunderstorms, tornado warnings and also indications of wind sheer in the approach route to Ardmore Municipal Airport. Reed Pigman had apparently concealed his heart problems from the authorities. There is a memorial at the Ardmore Municipal Airport for the crew and passengers that were involved in this accident. Pigman's widow, Virginia, continued to operate the American Flyers School of Aviation after her husband's death.

See also
 List of defunct airlines of the United States

References

External links
 Entry about American Flyers Airline on zoggavia.com
 Additional history on dc-8jet.com

Defunct airlines of the United States
Airlines established in 1949
Airlines disestablished in 1971
Defunct companies based in Oklahoma
Companies based in Ardmore, Oklahoma
Airlines based in Oklahoma